Nienke Kremers (born 21 February 1985 in Eindhoven, North Brabant) is a Dutch field hockey player, who plays as a midfielder for Dutch club HC Den Bosch.  She also plays for the Netherlands national team and she was part of the Dutch squad that became 2007 Champions Trophy winner.

References

1985 births
Living people
Dutch female field hockey players
Sportspeople from Eindhoven
HC Den Bosch players
21st-century Dutch women